3-Maleylpyruvic acid, or 3-maleylpyruvate, is a dicarboxylic acid formed by the oxidative ring opening of gentisic acid by gentisate 1,2-dioxygenase during the metabolism of tyrosine. It is converted into 3-fumarylpyruvate by maleylpyruvate isomerase.

References

Dicarboxylic acids